David William Harvey (March 23, 1908 – March 3, 1989) was an American Negro league pitcher in the 1930s and 1940s.

A native of Clarksdale, Mississippi, Harvey made his Negro leagues debut with the Memphis Red Sox in 1931. He went on to play for several other teams, with his longest stints coming with the Pittsburgh Crawfords and Baltimore Elite Giants. Harvey tossed a scoreless inning in the 1943 East–West All-Star Game, and served in the United States Army during World War II. He died in Baltimore, Maryland in 1989 at age 80.

References

External links
 and Baseball-Reference Black Baseball and Mexican League stats and Seamheads

1908 births
1989 deaths
Baltimore Elite Giants players
Cleveland Giants players
Columbus Blue Birds players
Memphis Red Sox players
Pittsburgh Crawfords players
Toledo Crawfords players
United States Army personnel of World War II
African Americans in World War II
Baseball pitchers
African-American United States Army personnel